John Steppling may refer to:
 John Steppling (actor)
 John Steppling (playwright)